Dimaro (in local dialect: Dimàr) is a comune (municipality) in Trentino in the northern Italian region Trentino-Alto Adige/Südtirol, located about  northwest of Trento.

The municipality of Dimaro contains the frazioni (subdivisions, mainly villages and hamlets) Folgarida and Carciato.

Dimaro borders the following municipalities: Malè, Commezzadura, Monclassico.

Demographic evolution

References

External links

 Homepage of the city

Cities and towns in Trentino-Alto Adige/Südtirol